Christina Ioannidi (original name: Χριστίνα Ιωαννίδη, born ) was a Soviet Union born Greek female weightlifter, competing in the 75 kg category and represented Greece at international competitions. 

She participated at the 2004 Summer Olympics in the 75 kg event. She competed at world championships, most recently at the 2002 World Weightlifting Championships.

Major results

References

External links
 
 http://www.the-sports.org/christina-ioannidi-weightlifting-spf7584.html

 http://www.gettyimages.com/photos/christina-ioannidi?excludenudity=true&sort=mostpopular&mediatype=photography&phrase=christina%20ioannidi&family=editorial
 https://www.youtube.com/watch?v=Vcg0xMM0wks

1982 births
Living people
Greek female weightlifters
Weightlifters at the 2004 Summer Olympics
Olympic weightlifters of Greece
Place of birth missing (living people)
World Weightlifting Championships medalists
Mediterranean Games silver medalists for Greece
Mediterranean Games medalists in weightlifting
Competitors at the 2001 Mediterranean Games
21st-century Greek people